Edmondo Mornese (November 14, 1910 in Alessandria – 1962) was an Italian professional football player.

He played for 6 seasons (162 games, 5 goals) in the Serie A for Novara Calcio and A.S. Roma.

Honours
 Serie A champion: 1941/42.

1910 births
1962 deaths
Italian footballers
Serie A players
Novara F.C. players
A.S. Roma players
Association football midfielders